Čelebići may refer to:

 Čelebići, Foča, a village in the municipality of Foča, Bosnia and Herzegovina
 Čelebići, Konjic, a village in the municipality of Konjic, Bosnia and Herzegovina
 Čelebići camp, a former prison camp in that village

See also
 Celebic (disambiguation)
 Çelebi (disambiguation)